Zanardi is a surname. Notable people with the surname include:

Alberta Zanardi (born 1940), Italian sprint canoer
Alex Zanardi (born 1966), Italian racing driver and paracyclist
Gentile Zanardi (late 17th century), Italian painter
Giovanni Zanardi (1700-1769), Italian painter
Silvia Zanardi (born 2000), Italian professional racing cyclist